City of Hamilton may refer to:

The Bermuda Islands UK Overseas Territory
Hamilton, Bermuda

Canada:
Hamilton, Ontario

United States:
Hamilton, Alabama
Hamilton, Georgia
Hamilton, Illinois
Hamilton, Iowa
Hamilton, Kansas
Hamilton, Missouri
Hamilton, Montana
Hamilton, North Dakota
Hamilton, Ohio
Hamilton, Texas
Hamilton City, California

Australia:
Hamilton, Victoria
City of Hamilton (Victoria), the former local government administering Hamilton.